Anne Kerylen (6 December 1943 – 23 March 2021) was a French actress who specialized in dubbing.

Biography
Kerylen grew up with a distinguished passion for the theatre. In her adolescence, she acted in her first piece. She studied literature at the University of Lille upon the persistence of her parents. She then became a professor of Latin, French, and Greek. She then entered the Conservatoire de Lille and was an amateur theatre actress after her graduation. She subsequently moved to Paris to devote herself to television.

Kerylen grew some stardom after her appearance on the soap opera  and the television program . From 1978 on, she mainly worked in dubbing. She dubbed over many American series, such as Charlie's Angels, Little House on the Prairie, Santa Barbara, The Young and the Restless, and others. She also worked as an artistic director for Dubbing Brothers and Télétota.

Anne Kerylen died on 23 March 2021 at the age of 77.

Filmography

Cinema
Pano ne passera pas (1969)
 (1970)
I Am Frigid... Why? (1972)
Tout bas (1974)
 (1975)

Television
La Brigade des maléfices (1971)
Les Gens de Mogador (1972)
Au théâtre ce soir (1974)
 (1977)
Claire (1986)
1996 (1987)
La Femme abandonnée (1992)

References

1943 births
2021 deaths
20th-century French actresses
University of Lille Nord de France alumni
Actresses from Paris